, nicknamed "Matton", is a Japanese former professional baseball catcher in Japan's Nippon Professional Baseball. He played for the Fukuoka Daiei Hawks/Fukuoka SoftBank Hawks in 2000, and from 2003 to 2008 and with the Chiba Lotte Marines in 2010 and 2011.

Matoba is an ordained priest within the Ōtani-ha branch of Shin Buddhism.

References

External links

NBP

1977 births
Living people
Asian Games medalists in baseball
Asian Games silver medalists for Japan
Baseball players at the 1998 Asian Games
Chiba Lotte Marines players
Fukuoka Daiei Hawks players
Fukuoka SoftBank Hawks players
Japanese baseball coaches
Japanese baseball players
Medalists at the 1998 Asian Games
Meiji University alumni
Nippon Professional Baseball catchers
Nippon Professional Baseball coaches
Baseball people from Osaka
Jōdo Shinshū Buddhist priests